James Talbot, SJ is a former American Jesuit priest, teacher, and coach who was convicted of raping multiple students over a period of several decades.

Abuse
In the 1970s, while serving as a hockey, soccer, and wrestling coach as well as a history teacher at Boston College High School (BC High), Talbot was accused of rape and other charges of sexual misconduct. In response, the Jesuits chose to move him to another high school, Cheverus High School. In 2005, at the age of 67, he was convicted of several counts of abuse during his tenure at Boston College High School, and served six years in prison for the crimes. In a civil suit, 13 victims who sued the Society of Jesus and the high school received a $5.2 million settlement. At the time of his release, proceedings to laicize Talbot were still incomplete. He was removed from the clerical state in 2013. This case was one of several that are collectively known as the Catholic Archdiocese of Boston sex abuse scandal, and part of the larger Catholic Church sex abuse cases in the United States.

Talbot transferred from BCHS to Cheverus in 1980, where he remained until 1998, again in the role of history teacher and soccer coach in an all-male school. In 1998 a student brought information to the bishop that her brother had been molested by Talbot, who by that time was molesting yet another student. Talbot was released from prison for the BCHS charges in 2011, only to be charged for crimes committed at Cheverus. In 2017, Talbot was extradited to Maine, and in 2018 at age 80, was sentenced to two concurrent three-year sentences after pleading guilty to both gross sexual assault and unlawful sexual contact. These charges both centered around the raping a nine-year-old boy at a church in Freeport, Maine. Between prison stays, Talbot resided at Vianney Renewal Center, a Catholic faith based treatment center in Missouri run by the Congregation of the Servants of the Paraclete to aid priests and brothers with personal difficulties. He immediately began serving his 2018 sentence following his guilty plea.

Talbot admitted to abusing "88 or 89" students altogether. One case is depicted in the movie Spotlight, which starred Michael Keaton in the role of Boston Globe editor Walter V. Robinson, who attended BCHS and who broke the story of the Catholic Archdiocese of Boston sex abuse scandal in 2002.

References

Date of birth missing (living people)
Living people
American people convicted of child sexual abuse
Catholic Church sexual abuse scandals in the United States
Roman Catholic Archdiocese of Boston
Sexual abuse cover-ups
American people convicted of rape
American members of the clergy convicted of crimes
20th-century American Jesuits
21st-century American Jesuits
Catholic priests convicted of child sexual abuse
Year of birth missing (living people)
Violence against men in North America
Sexual abuse scandal in the Society of Jesus